"Get Ready for This" is a song recorded by Belgian/Dutch music group 2 Unlimited. It was released in 1991 as the lead single from their debut album, Get Ready! (1992). Originally, the single was produced as an instrumental, titled the "Orchestral Mix". It became a hit and conscious of their popularity, Wilde & De Coster wanted a more accessible, formatted formula for their project to grow. Ray was then asked to write lyrics and add a rap to the track. On Ray Slijngaard's suggestion, Anita Doth joined as the female vocalist.

The single was an immediate success throughout Europe with notable peaks worldwide, including Australia and the US. It is arguably the most famous of the band's singles in the United States having charted at number 14 on the US Billboard Hot Dance Club Play chart, number 17 on the Billboard Top 40 Mainstream and number 38 on the Billboard Hot 100, making it the band's only top-40 hit in the US. In the UK, the single went to number two on the UK Singles Chart.

The song is one of the most frequently played songs at sporting events around the world. It earned one of BMI's Pop Awards of 1996, honoring the songwriters, composers and music publishers of the song. In 2010, Pitchfork included it in their list of "Ten Actually Good 90s Jock Jams".

Background
In 1990, producers Phil Wilde and Jean-Paul de Coster had previously gained success with AB Logic, and were looking for another vehicle for their songs. 2 Unlimited formed when Wilde and DeCoster were introduced to rapper Ray Slijngaard and vocalist Anita Doth by Marvin D., who had featured both in his rap group in the past.

The rap version was released with raps by Ray Slijngaard and vocals by Anita Doth. For the UK release of the single, an edit of the original "Orchestral Mix" was used, without vocals except for the line "Y'all ready for this?" This was sampled from The D.O.C.'s hit single "It's Funky Enough." This edit was done by record producer Pete Waterman, who owned the record label 2 Unlimited were licensed to for UK releases.

Critical reception
Larry Flick from Billboard wrote, "Spirited and melodic techno/houser reaches these shores after massive pop and club success in the U.K. Although it has yet to be confirmed, rumor has it that famed hi-NRG producers Mike Stock and Pete Waterman are the creative force behind this peak-hour treat. Look for jocks to devour this one heartily." Carolyn Chard from The Canberra Times described the song a "mammoth rave hit". She added further, "An instantly recognisable, hands-in-the-air track it belongs to the same Belgium-Dutch school of techno house that produced Quadrophonia, T99 and Technotronic." Andy Kastanas from The Charlotte Observer stated that "the raving keyboards and hypnotic dance beat make for a super dance record."

Chart performance
"Get Ready for This" was successful on the charts on several continents. In Europe, it peaked within the top 10 in Belgium, Ireland, the Netherlands, Spain (number two) and the United Kingdom, as well as on the Eurochart Hot 100, where it made it to number four. In the UK, the single reached also number two in its fourth week at the UK Singles Chart, on October 20, 1991. It spent a total of two weeks at that position. Additionally, "Get Ready for This" climbed into the top 30 in Finland and the top 40 in Sweden. Outside Europe, it peaked at number two in Australia, number five in Zimbabwe, number six on the RPM Dance/Urban chart in Canada, number 14 on the Billboard Hot Dance Club Play chart and number 38 on the Billboard Hot 100.

Track listing

 7", Byte Records / BYTE 7006 (Benelux)
A: "Get Ready for This (Rap Version)" – 3:42
B: "Get Ready for This (Instrumental)" – 3:42

 7", PWL Continental / PWL 206 (UK)
A: "Get Ready for This (Orchestral Edit)" – 2:53
B: "Get Ready for This (800 Edit)" – 3:30

 12", PWL Continental / PWLT 206 (UK)
A: "Get Ready for This (Orchestral Edit)" – 5:31
B: "Get Ready for This (800 Edit)" – 5:14

 12", ZYX Records / ZYX 6599-12 (Germany)
A: "Get Ready for This (Orchestral Mix)" – 5:26
B: "Get Ready for This (Rap Version)" – 5:54
BB: "Get Ready for This (Wilde Mix)" – 5:57

 12", Hot Productions / HAL 12256 (US)
A: "Get Ready for This (Orchestral Edit)" – 5:31
B: "Get Ready for This (800 Edit)" – 5:14
BB: "Pacific Walk" – 3:05

 The Remixes 12", Hot Productions / HAL 12261 (US)
A: "Get Ready for This (Orchestral Mix)" – 5:26
AA: "Get Ready for This (Rap Version)" – 5:54
B: "Get Ready for This (Wilde Mix)" – 5:57
BB: "Get Ready for This (Rio & Le Jean Mix)" – 3:08

 CD, Byte Records / BYTE 5006 (Benelux)
"Get Ready for This" (Rap Version) – 5:53
"Get Ready for This" (Orchestral Mix) – 5:31
"Get Ready for This" (Wilde Mix) – 5:55
"Get Ready for This" (Rio & Le Jean Mix) – 3:06
"Get Ready for This" (Rapversion Edit) – 3:42

 CD, PWL Continental / PWCD 206 (UK)
"Get Ready for This (Orchestral Mix:Edit)" – 2:53
"Get Ready for This (Orchestral Mix)" – 5:31
"Get Ready for This (800 Mix:Edit)" – 3:30

 CD, ZYX Records / ZYX 6599-8 (Germany)
"Get Ready for This" (7" Rap Version) – 3:42
"Get Ready for This" (Orchestral Mix) – 5:26
"Get Ready for This (Rap Version)" – 5:54
"Get Ready for This" (Wilde Mix) – 5:57

 CD, Critique / 01624 15490-2 (US)
"Get Ready for This (Radio Mix)" – 3:42
"Get Ready for This (No Rap Mix)" – 2:51
"Get Ready for This (Rap Mix)" – 5:26
"Get Ready for This (Orchestral Mix)" – 5:54
"Get Ready for The Twilight Zone" – 3:55

Charts

Weekly charts

Year-end charts

Certifications and sales

Yves Deruyter remixes

After the moderate success of the 2 Unlimited compilation album Greatest Hits Remixes in 2001, two white labels were released with remixes of "Get Ready for This". The first 12" was released in May 2001 in Belgium with a remix by DJ/producer Yves Deruyter. Although just a single sided pressing featuring the full 12" remix, the radio edit was officially released later in the 2002 release Trance Remixes (Special Edition).

Track listing
 12" white label
A: "Get Ready for This" (Yves Deruyter Remix)

Robbie Rivera remixes
Following the May 2001 release of the Yves Deruyter remixes, August the same year saw the release of another "Get Ready for This" remix by Puerto Rican DJ/producer Robbie Rivera.

Track listing
 12" white label
A: "Get Ready for This" (Robbie's Bangin' Dub)
B1: "Get Ready for This" (68 Beat Monster Mix)
B2: "Get Ready for This" (Robbie Rivera Remix)

Steve Aoki remixes

In 2013, American DJ/producer Steve Aoki released a remix of "Get Ready for This" on Byte Records as part of a forthcoming 2 Unlimited greatest hits album. The Rap and Orchestral mixes featured on the original "Get Ready for This" single were also included.

Track listing
 Download 1 (Steve Aoki Remixes EP)
"Get Ready" (Steve Aoki Instrumental Extended) (5:25)
"Get Ready" (Steve Aoki Instrumental Edit) (4:21)
"Get Ready" (2013 Rap Version Edit) (3:42)
"Get Ready" (2013 Orchestral Mix) (5:26)

 Download 2 (Steve Aoki Radio Mixes)
"Get Ready" (Steve Aoki Vocal Radio Edit) (2:55)
"Get Ready" (Steve Aoki Instrumental Radio Edit) (2:55)

Weekly charts

References

1991 songs
1991 debut singles
2 Unlimited songs
Orlando Magic
San Antonio Spurs
Pete Waterman Entertainment singles
Songs written by Phil Wilde
Songs written by Ray Slijngaard
Songs written by Jean-Paul De Coster
Byte Records singles
ZYX Music singles
Music videos directed by David Betteridge